The American science fiction writer Clifford D. Simak (August 3, 1904 – April 25, 1988) was honored by fans with three Hugo Awards and by colleagues with one Nebula Award. The Science Fiction Writers of America made him its third SFWA Grand Master and the Horror Writers Association made him one of three inaugural winners of the Bram Stoker Award for Lifetime Achievement.

Novels

 The Creator (48-page novelette: first magazine publication 1935, first book publication 1946)
 Cosmic Engineers (first published as a "short novel" in Astounding Science Fiction, February 1939, March 1939, and April 1939, expanded slightly for novel publication, 1950.)  A crew is piped to the edge of known space, where metal-men Cosmic Engineers need help to prevent two universes from colliding, while opposing Hellhounds want destruction and chaos.
 Empire (1951) (Galaxy novel #7).  A businessman's monopoly of accumulator engines brings power to run the solar system's politics. Until a physicist and entrepreneur develop a rival engine and declare a war for freedom.
 Time and Again (1951) Alternate paperback title: First He Died; serialized (with a different ending) as Time Quarry.  When a long-lost spaceman returns to Earth from a distant planet where our "souls" may live, his fuddled observations spark a religious schism and war.
 City (1952)  In the far future, only dogs and robots are left on Earth to recount the old stories and debate whether Man ever existed at all.  "Epilog" was added in 1981.
 Ring Around the Sun (1953) A man's unique psychic gift allows him to step into parallel "quantum" earths—a ring around the sun—where he may become mankind's last chance for survival.
 Time is the Simplest Thing (1961) Serialized in Analog April, May, June, July 1961 as The Fisherman.  A paranormal who telepathically travels to other planets brings back an alien consciousness that can manipulate time.  He will need the help as humans rise to wipe out "parries".
 The Trouble with Tycho (1961) First published in Amazing Science Fiction, October 1960. A lunar prospector investigates the crater Tycho where spacecraft have disappeared.
 They Walked Like Men (1962)  A newsman learns alien "bowling balls" that can take any form are buying up the Earth.
 Way Station (1963) Serialized in Galaxy Magazine June and August 1963 as Here Gather the Stars. 1964 Hugo Award Winner. A Civil War veteran is a caretaker of a secret Way Station, a transfer point for aliens.  But the outside world is snooping around, and their blundering may endanger all of humanity.
 All Flesh Is Grass (1965)  The town of Millville is trapped in a bubble by an alien hive-race of purple flowers.  It has established a toehold for mutual cooperation—or invasion.
 Why Call Them Back From Heaven? (1967) A man becomes embroiled in a scandal at a wealthy cryonics corporation.
 The Werewolf Principle (1967) An astronaut returns to Earth with two different creatures trapped inside him, so in times of stress morphs into either a "werewolf" or an impregnable pyramid.
 The Goblin Reservation (1968)  A traveler teleporting home learns he was murdered a week before by either sneaking aliens or their rivals, the leprechauns and trolls of the local reservation.
 Out of Their Minds (1970)  A newsman is hunted by werewolves, dinosaurs, sea serpents, and other creatures from human imagination, and no one will tell him why.
 Destiny Doll (1971) Four humans explore the mysteries of an eerie deserted planet.
 A Choice of Gods (1972)  After 99.99% of the human race has disappeared, people discover they have lifespans of five or six thousand years.
 Cemetery World (1973)  Earth has been turned into a vast and silent cemetery.  A composer and a treasure-hunter have come to venture past the walls into the wilderness, where they find renegades, war machines, steel wolves, and ghosts whispering answers.
 Our Children's Children (1974)  Refugees from 500 years in the future arrive through time tunnels - and hard behind them come ravening monsters.
 Enchanted Pilgrimage (1975)  When a scholar finds a hidden manuscript he sets out to discover the secrets of the wasteland, accompanied by fellow travelers who join him along the way.
 Shakespeare's Planet (1976)  Two explorers, a robot, a warrior, and even an inky "pond" are stuck on a dead-end planet because the star-tunnel is locked.  Yet something is about to happen.
 A Heritage of Stars (1977)  In a primitive world where technology collapsed, a woodsrunner, a witch, and a frontiering robot seek answers at The Place of Going to the Stars.
 The Fellowship of the Talisman (1978) On a parallel Earth perpetually laid waste by the Harriers of the Horde, a young man must ferry what may be a true account of Jesus' teachings to distant London.  He is helped by a lonely ghost, a goblin, a demon, and a warrior woman riding a griffin.
 Mastodonia (1978) (published as Catface in the UK, a considerably expanded and re-written version of Simak's 1955 short story Project Mastodon which was also broadcast on the X Minus One radio program). A cat-faced alien stranded in Wisconsin befriends locals, then time-engineers portals into prehistoric epochs. The locals start a tourism company for big-game hunters, and maybe a new country: Mastodonia.
 The Visitors (1980).  Giant black boxes land on Earth to eat trees. Completely ignored, humans wonder if this is an invasion or something even more sinister.
 Project Pope (1981) On the planet End of Nothing, robots have labored a thousand years to build a computerized infallible pope to eke out the ultimate truth.  Their work is preempted when a human Listener discovers what might be the planet Heaven.
 Where the Evil Dwells (1982) Adventurers seeking a lost fiancée and cathedral enter the Empty Lands, where even Roman Legions get slaughtered.
 Special Deliverance (1982)  A college professor and other oddballs are dropped onto a bleak world near a giant blue cube - and no clue how to proceed.
 Highway of Eternity (1986)  A man who can "step around a corner" gets scattered across time alongside futuristic refugees.  All are fleeing super-advanced humans who have transcended into pure thought—and expect everyone else to come along.

Collections
 City (1952) Contains "City", "Huddling Place", "Census", "Desertion", "Paradise", "Hobbies", "Aesop ", "The Simple Way".
 Strangers in the Universe (1956) Contains "Target Generation", "Mirage", "Beachhead", "The Answers", "Retrograde Evolution", "The Fence", "Shadow Show", "Contraption", "Immigrant", "Kindergarten" and "Skirmish".
 The Worlds of Clifford Simak (1960) Contains "Dusty Zebra", "Honorable Opponent", "Carbon Copy", "Founding Father", "Idiot's Crusade", "The Big Front Yard", "Operation Stinky", "Jackpot", "Death Scene", "Lulu", "Green Thumb" and "Neighbor".
 Aliens for Neighbours (1961) UK abridgment of The Worlds of Clifford Simak. Contains "Dusty Zebra", "Honorable Opponent", "Carbon Copy", "Idiot's Crusade", "Operation Stinky", "Jackpot", "Death Scene", "Green Thumb" and "Neighbor".
 All the Traps of Earth and Other Stories (1962) Contains "All the Traps of Earth", "Good Night, Mr. James", "Drop Dead", "No Life Of Their Own", "The Sitters", "Crying Jag", "Installment Plan", "Condition of Employment" and "Project Mastodon".
 Other Worlds of Clifford Simak (1962) Abridgment of The Worlds of Clifford Simak (1961). Contains "Dusty Zebra", "Carbon Copy", "Founding Father", "Idiot's Crusade", "Death Scene" and "Green Thumb".
 The Night of the Puudly (1964) Contains "The Night of the Puudly", "Crying Jag", "Installment Plan", "Condition of Employment" and "Project Mastodon".
 Worlds Without End (1964) Contains "Worlds Without End", "The Spaceman's Van Gogh" and "Full Cycle".
 Best Science Fiction Stories of Clifford D. Simak (1967) Contains "Founding Father", "Immigrant", "New Folks Home", "Crying Jag", "All the Traps of Earth", "Lulu" and "Neighbor".
 So Bright the Vision (1968) Contains "The Golden Bugs", "Leg. Forst.", "So Bright the Vision," and "Galactic Chest".
 The Best of Clifford D. Simak (1975) Contains "Madness from Mars", "Sunspot Purge", "The Sitters", "A Death in the House", "Final Gentleman", "Shotgun Cure", "Day of Truce", "Small Deer", "The Thing in the Stone" and "The Autumn Land".
 Skirmish: The Great Short Fiction of Clifford D. Simak (1977) Contains "Huddling Place", "Desertion", "Skirmish", "Good Night, Mr. James", "The Sitters", "The Big Front Yard", "All the Traps of Earth", "The Thing in the Stone", "The Autumn Land" and "The Ghost of a Model T".
 Brother And Other Stories (1986) Contains "Brother", "Over the River and Through the Woods", "Auk House" and "Kindergarten".
 The Marathon Photograph (1986) Contains "The Birch Clump Cylinder", "The Whistling Well", "The Marathon Photograph" and "The Grotto of the Dancing Deer". Introduction by Francis Lyall.
 Off-Planet (1989) Contains "Construction Shack", "Ogre", "Junkyard", "The Observer", "The World That Couldn't Be", "Shadow World" and "Mirage". Introduction by Francis Lyall.
 The Autumn Land and Other Stories (1990) Contains "Rule 18", "Jackpot", "Contraption", "Courtesy", "Gleaners" and "The Autumn Land".
 Immigrant and Other Stories (1991) Contains "Neighbor", "Green Thumb", "Small Deer", "The Ghost of a Model T", "Byte your Tongue!", "I am Crying All Inside" and "Immigrant". Introduction by Francis Lyall.
 The Creator and Other Stories (1993) Contains "The Creator", "Shotgun Cure", "All the Traps of Earth", "Death Scene", "Reunion On Ganymede", "The Money Tree", "Party Line", "The Answers" and "The Thing in the Stone".
 Over the River and Through the Woods: The Best Short Fiction of Clifford D. Simak (1996) Contains "A Death in the House", "The Big Front Yard", "Good Night, Mr. James", "Dusty Zebra", "Neighbor", "Over the River and Through the Woods", "Construction Shack" and "The Grotto of the Dancing Deer". Introduction by Poul Anderson.
 The Civilization Game and Other Stories (1997) Contains "Horrible Example", "The Civilisation Game", "Hermit Of Mars", "Masquerade", "Buckets Of Diamonds", "Hunch" and "The Big Front Yard".

 I Am Crying All Inside and Other Stories (The Complete Short Fiction of Clifford D. Simak Volume One) (2015) 
Contains “Clifford D. Simak: Grand Master Indeed!” (essay by David W. Wixon), "Installment Plan", "I Had No Head and My Eyes Were Floating Way Up in the Air", "Small Deer", "Ogre", "Gleaners", "Madness from Mars", "Gunsmoke Interlude", "I Am Crying All Inside", "The Call from Beyond", "All the Traps of Earth".

 The Big Front Yard and Other Stories (The Complete Short Fiction of Clifford D. Simak Volume Two) (2015) 
Contains “Clifford D. Simak: Learning All the Words” (essay by David W. Wixon), "The Big Front Yard", "The Observer", "Trail City's Hot-Lead Crusaders", "Junkyard", "Mr. Meek - Musketeer", "Neighbor", "Shadow World", "So Bright the Vision".

 The Ghost of a Model T and Other Stories (The Complete Short Fiction of Clifford D. Simak Volume Three) (2015)  
Contains “Clifford D. Simak and ‘City’: The Seal of Greatness” (essay by David W. Wixon), "Leg. Forst.", "Physician to the Universe", "No More Hides and Tallow", "Condition of Employment", "City", "Mirage", "The Autumn Land", "Founding Father", "Byte Your Tongue!", "The Street That Wasn't There", "The Ghost of a Model T".

 Grotto of the Dancing Deer and Other Stories (The Complete Short Fiction of Clifford D. Simak Volume Four) (2016)
Contains “The Language of Clifford D. Simak” (essay by David W. Wixon), “Unsilent Spring”, “Day of Truce”, “Jackpot”, “Mutiny on Mercury”, “Hunger Death”, “Crying Jag”, “The Civilization Game”, “The Reformation of Hangman's Gulch”, “The Grotto of the Dancing Deer” and “Over the River and Through the Woods”.

 No Life of Their Own and Other Stories (The Complete Short Fiction of Clifford D. Simak Volume Five) (2016)
Contains “Introduction: Clifford Simak's Country” (essay by David W. Wixon), “No Life of Their Own”, “Spaceship in a Flask”, “The Loot of Time”, “Huddling Place • [City]”, “To Walk a City's Street”, “Cactus Colts • non-genre”, “Message from Mars”, “Party Line”, “A Hero Must Not Die”, “The Space-Beasts”, “Contraption” and “The Whistling Well”.

 New Folks' Home and Other Stories (The Complete Short Fiction of Clifford D. Simak Volume Six) (2016)
Contains “Introduction: The Names in Simak” (essay by David W. Wixon), “New Folks' Home”, “Second Childhood”, “The Questing of Foster Adams”, “Barb Wire Brings Bullets!”, “Worlds Without End”, “Hermit of Mars”, “Beachhead”, “Sunspot Purge”, “Drop Dead” and “Worrywart”.

 A Death in the House and Other Stories (The Complete Short Fiction of Clifford D. Simak Volume Seven) (2016)
Contains “Introduction: The Misunderstood ‘Hiatus’” (essay by David W. Wixon), “Operation Stinky”, “Green Thumb”, “When It's Hangnoose Time in Hell”, “The Sitters”, “Tools”, “Target Generation”, “War Is Personal”, “Nine Lives”, “A Death in the House” and “The Birch Clump Cylinder”.

 Good Night, Mr. James and Other Stories (The Complete Short Fiction of Clifford D. Simak Volume Eight) (2016)
Contains “Introduction: The Non-Fiction of Clifford D. Simak” (essay by David W. Wixon), “Good Night, Mr. James”, “Brother”, “Senior Citizen”, “The Gunsmoke Drummer Sells a War”, “Kindergarten”, “Reunion on Ganymede”, “Galactic Chest”, “Death Scene”, “Census” and “Auk House”.

 Earth for Inspiration and Other Stories (The Complete Short Fiction of Clifford D. Simak Volume Nine) (2016)
Contains “Introduction: The Simak Westerns” (essay by David W. Wixon), “Earth for Inspiration”, “Idiot's Crusade”, “Hellhounds of the Cosmos”, “Honorable Opponent”, “Green Flight, Out!”, “Carbon Copy”, “The Asteroid of Gold”, “Good Nesters Are Dead Nesters!”, “Desertion”, “The Golden Bugs” and “Full Cycle”.

 The Shipshape Miracle and Other Stories (The Complete Short Fiction of Clifford D. Simak Volume Ten) (2017)
Contains “Introduction: Little Things: The Way Clifford D. Simak Wrote” (essay by David W. Wixon), “The Money Tree”, “Shotgun Cure”, “Paradise”, “The Gravestone Rebels Ride by Night!”, “How-2”, “The Shipshape Miracle”, “Rim of the Deep”, “Eternity Lost” and “Immigrant”.

 Dusty Zebra and Other Stories (The Complete Short Fiction of Clifford D. Simak Volume Eleven) (2017)
Contains “Introduction: Clifford D. Simak: Opinions of a Reticent Author” (essay by David W. Wixon), “Dusty Zebra”, “Guns on Guadalcanal”, “Courtesy”, “The Voice in the Void”, “Retrograde Evolution”, “Way for the Hangtown Rebel!”, “Final Gentleman” and “Project Mastodon”.

 The Thing in the Stone and Other Stories (The Complete Short Fiction of Clifford D. Simak Volume Twelve) (2017)
Contains “Introduction: Clifford D. Simak: Seeker After the Truth” (essay by David W. Wixon), “The World of the Red Sun”, “The Thing in the Stone”, “Skirmish”, “Aesop”, “The Hangnoose Army Rides to Town!”, “Univac: 2200”, “The Creator”, “The Spaceman's Van Gogh”, “Hunch” and “Construction Shack”.

Science fiction short stories

The table is ordered by date; select an arrow to sort by another column.

Western short stories

Simak wrote a few Western pulp stories.

War short stories

Simak wrote a few war stories during World War II.

Non-fiction books

 The Solar System: Our New Front Yard (1962)
 Trilobite, Dinosaur, and Man: The Earth's Story (1965)
 Wonder and Glory: The Story of the Universe (1969)
 Prehistoric Man: The Story of Man's Rise to Civilization (1971)

Edited books

 From Atoms to Infinity: Readings in Modern Science (1965)
 The March of Science (1971)
 Nebula Award Stories 6 (1971)

Film adaptations

 "Good Night, Mr. James" was adapted as "The Duplicate Man" on The Outer Limits in 1964. Simak notes this is a "vicious story — so vicious that it is the only one of my stories adapted to television."
Notwithstanding Simak's quote, three other Simak stories were adapted for television, one on two separate occasions. "Immigrant" and "Target Generation" were adapted for the 1962 UK anthology series Out of This World, and in 1969 "Beach Head" and "Target Generation" (again) were adapted for the third season of the UK anthology series Out of the Unknown. These series were never shown in the US, and it's doubtful Simak ever saw them. All four episodes were wiped sometime in the 1970s, and are believed lost.

Audiotapes

 Clifford D. Simak; Over the River and Through the Woods (read by Jonathan Frakes) (1995)

References

External links
 

Simak, Clifford D.